CoCa may refer to: 

 Center on Contemporary Art, non-profit arts organization in Seattle, Washington, USA
 Centre of Contemporary Art, curated art gallery in Christchurch, New Zealand
 Coheed and Cambria, American progressive rock band